Kashi Paudel is a Nepalese politician. She was elected to the Pratinidhi Sabha in the 1999 election on behalf of the Nepali Congress.

References

Living people
Nepali Congress politicians from Lumbini Province
Year of birth missing (living people)
20th-century Nepalese women politicians
20th-century Nepalese politicians
21st-century Nepalese women politicians
21st-century Nepalese politicians
Nepal MPs 1999–2002